The 2021–22 FA Trophy (known for sponsorship reasons as the Buildbase FA Trophy) was the 53rd season of the FA Trophy, an annual football competition for teams at levels 5-8 of the English National League System. The competition consisted of three qualifying rounds, and seven proper rounds.  Teams from level 8 entered into the first qualifying round and second qualifying round, level 7 into the third qualifying round, level 6 (the National League North and National League South) into round 2, and level 5 (the National League) into round 3.

All matches were in a single-match knockout format, with the winner decided by penalties if the match was drawn after 90 minutes, apart from the Final where the winner was decided by extra-time and penalties if the match was drawn. This was the same format as the 2020–21 season which was a change from previous seasons where replays were used and where the semi-finals were scheduled as two-legged.

Calendar
The calendar for the 2021-22 Buildbase FA Trophy, as announced by The Football Association.

First Round Qualifying
The draw for the first qualifying round was made on 9 July 2021. The round included 38 teams from tier 8, the lowest tier in the competition.

Second Round Qualifying
The draw for the second qualifying round was made on 9 July 2021, and saw 119 clubs from tier 8 joining the 19 winners from the first qualifying round.

Third Round Qualifying
The draw for the third qualifying round was made on 11 October 2021, and saw 87 clubs from tier 7 joining the 69 winners from the second qualifying round.

First round proper
The draw for the first round proper was made on 1 November 2021, and featured the 78 winners from the third qualifying round with no additional teams.

Second round proper
The draw for the second round took place on 15 November 2021, featuring the 39 winners from the previous round as well as the 43 teams entering from the sixth tier.

Third round proper

The draw for the third round took place on 29 November 2021, with the winners of the 41 second round proper matches being joined by the 23 National League clubs.

Fourth round proper
The draw for the fourth round took place on 20 December 2021 and was made up of the 32 winners from the previous round. Plymouth Parkway and Larkhall Athletic of the eighth tier were the lowest-ranked teams remaining.

Fifth round proper
The draw for the fifth round took place on 17 January 2022 and was made up of the 16 winners from the previous round. Cheshunt, Morpeth Town, Needham Market and Stourbridge of the seventh tier were the lowest-ranked teams remaining.

Quarter-finals
The draw for the quarter finals took place on 14 February 2022 and was made up of the 8 winners from the previous round. Needham Market of the seventh tier were the lowest-ranked team remaining.

Semi-finals
The draw for the semi-finals took place on 14 March 2022 and featured the four winners from the previous round. York City of the sixth tier were the lowest-ranked team remaining.

Final

Notes

References

External links

FA Trophy seasons
FA Trophy